States' Rights Party may refer to:

Dixiecrats or States' Rights Democratic Party, a short-lived (1948) segregationist political party in the United States
States' Rights Party of Louisiana, organized in 1956 in opposition to racial integration of schools; see History of Louisiana 
National States' Rights Party, a far-right white supremacist party in existence in the U.S. from 1958 to 1987
States' Rights Party, the party name used by the T. Coleman Andrews–Thomas H. Werdel presidential ticket in 1956

See also
 States' rights